Paul Kantor may refer to:

Paul Kantor (musician) (born 1955), American violin teacher
Paul B. Kantor, American information scientist

See also
Paul Cantor (disambiguation)
Paul Kantner (1941–2016), American rock musician